Barra Grande Airport  is the airport serving Barra Grande in the Municipality of Maraú, Brazil.

Airlines and destinations

Access

See also

List of airports in Brazil

References

External links

Airports in Bahia